Wa Sports Stadium is a multi-use stadium in Wa, Ghana.  It used mostly for football matches and is the home stadium of All Stars F.C. of the Ghana Premier League.  The stadium holds 5,000 spectators.

External links
Stadium information

Football venues in Ghana
Wa, Ghana
2006 establishments in Ghana
Event venues established in 2006